Wanda Letitia Nesbitt (born December 7, 1956) is a United States diplomat. A career Foreign Service officer, she has been appointed U.S Ambassador to several countries. From November 2013 to October 2017, she served as senior vice president of the National Defense University.

Education 
Nesbitt is from Philadelphia, Pennsylvania. She attended the Philadelphia High School for Girls. She graduated from the University of Pennsylvania with a degree in international relations and French. She also attended the National War College.

Career 
From January 2002 to August 2004, Nesbitt was the United States Ambassador to Madagascar, the United States Ambassador to Cote d'Ivoire from 2007-2010 and she was appointed United States Ambassador to Namibia on September 24, 2010.

She was succeeded as US Ambassador to Namibia by Thomas F. Daughton, who was sworn in on October 6, 2014.

References

External links

1956 births
Living people
Ambassadors of the United States to Ivory Coast
Ambassadors of the United States to Madagascar
Ambassadors of the United States to Namibia
American women ambassadors
National War College alumni
People from Philadelphia
Philadelphia High School for Girls alumni
University of Pennsylvania alumni
African-American diplomats
Ambassadors of the United States to the Comoros
United States Foreign Service personnel
21st-century African-American people
21st-century African-American women
21st-century American diplomats
20th-century African-American people
20th-century African-American women